Simon James Heffer (born 18 July 1960) is an English historian, journalist, author and political commentator.  He has published several biographies and a series of books on the social history of Great Britain from the mid-nineteenth century until the end of the First World War.  He was appointed professorial research fellow at the University of Buckingham in 2017.

He worked as a columnist for the Daily Mail and since 2015 has had a weekly column in The Sunday Telegraph. As a political commentator, Heffer takes a socially conservative position.

Family and education
Heffer was born in Chelmsford, Essex, and was educated there at King Edward VI Grammar School before going to read English at Corpus Christi College, Cambridge (MA); after he had become a successful journalist his old university later awarded him a PhD in History for a book on Enoch Powell.

Career

Journalism 
Heffer worked for The Daily Telegraph until 1995. He worked as a columnist for the Daily Mail from 1995 to 2005. He rejoined the Telegraph in October 2005 as a columnist and associate editor. Martin Newland, the Daily Telegraph editor at the time, described the newspaper as Heffer's "natural journalistic home". He left the Telegraph in May 2011 to "pursue a role in journalism and broadcasting" and  "complete a major literary project". It had been speculated that his departure had been prompted by his constant attacks on David Cameron's government, of which the Telegraph had been generally supportive. Heffer later rejoined the Daily Mail to edit a new online comment section, called RightMinds, of the paper's online edition. He returned to the Daily Telegraph in June 2015 and has a weekly column in the Sunday Telegraph.

Historian and author 
Heffer has written biographies of the historian and essayist Thomas Carlyle, the composer Ralph Vaughan Williams and of the British politician Enoch Powell (Like the Roman), which was described by the New Statesman as "a lucid and majestic tribute" to the politician. He received his PhD in modern history from Cambridge University for the 1998 Powell biography.

In September 2010, Heffer published Strictly English: the Correct Way to Write... and Why it Matters, a guide to English grammar and usage. The book met with some negative reception. Since 2010 he has published several historical works such as A Short History of Power (2010) and a series of three books on the social history of Great Britain from the mid nineteenth century until the end of the First World War – High Minds – the Victorians and the Birth of Modern Britain (2013), The Age of Decadence – Britain 1880 to 1914 and Staring at God – Britain 1914 to 1919 (2019).

Heffer became a professorial research fellow at the University of Buckingham in 2017.

Hillsborough comments
Heffer said in 2012 that he wrote the first draft of a Spectator editorial in 2004 regarding the death of Kenneth Bigley, which said in part:

These comments (sometimes incorrectly attributed to the then-editor of the Spectator, Boris Johnson) were widely circulated following the April 2016 verdict by the Hillsborough inquest's second hearing proving unlawful killing of the 96 dead at Hillsborough. Johnson apologised at the time of the publication, saying: "That was a lie that unfortunately and very, very regrettably got picked up in a leader in the Spectator in 2004, which I was then editing."

Politics
Heffer was politically left-wing in his teenage years, but had abandoned his views by the time he went to university, although he states he still has a lingering respect and affection for several past figures of the left, such as Michael Foot and Tony Benn.

Heffer is a social conservative, though in a recent interview he described himself as a Gladstonian Liberal. He supported the retention of Section 28, opposed the equalisation of the age of consent and the liberalisation of laws on abortion and divorce. He opposed the removal of hereditary peers from the House of Lords in 1999.

Heffer believes that Christianity should have a strong role in shaping both the moral foundation of society and public policy, but he is personally an atheist.

In 2008, Heffer called for the United Nations to be strengthened: "If the UN ceases to be regarded by the larger powers as an institution to secure the peace of the world and justice therein, then that holds out all sorts of potential dangers." On 27 May 2009, Heffer threatened to stand as an independent against Sir Alan Haselhurst, his local Conservative MP and a deputy speaker, unless Haselhurst paid back the £12,000 he claimed for work on his garden, as revealed in the Parliamentary expenses scandal. A month later, Haselhurst announced that he would pay the £12,000 back, while insisting it had been claimed within the rules.

In 2010, Heffer criticised the then Prime Minister, David Cameron, and modernising elements within the Conservative Party.

Heffer has written sympathetically about and backed the United Kingdom Independence Party (UKIP) and Nigel Farage. He supported the UK's withdrawal from the EU in the Brexit referendum. In an article in the Daily Telegraph, Heffer suggested that some of those who supported Britain remaining in the European Union were members of the Bilderberg Group and attendees of the World Economic Forum at Davos. From 2016 to 2019, he was part of the political advisory board of Leave Means Leave.

Personal life 
Heffer married his wife Diana Caroline in 1987. He has two children. Heffer lives in Essex with his family. His passions outside of politics include classical music and cricket.

Bibliography

 Heffer, Simon, & Charles Moore (editors), A Tory Seer: The Selected Journalism of T.E. Utley, London, 1989, 
 Heffer, Simon, Moral Desperado: A Life of Thomas Carlyle, London, 1995.
 Heffer, Simon, Power and Place: The Political Consequences of King Edward VII, London, 1998.
 Heffer, Simon, Like the Roman: The Life of Enoch Powell, London, 1998. 
 Heffer, Simon, Nor Shall My Sword: The Reinvention of England, London, 1999.
 Heffer, Simon, Vaughan Williams, London, 2000. 
 Heffer, Simon: Strictly English: The correct way to write... and why it matters, London : Rh Books, 2010, 

 Heffer, Simon, Simply English, London : RH Books, 2014.
 Heffer, Simon (2017)  The Age of Decadence: Britain 1880 to 1914, Random House, London  
 Heffer, Simon (2019) Staring at God: Britain in the Great War, Random House, London

Critical studies, reviews and biography

See also
 List of newspaper columnists

References

External links 
 www.macmillandictionaryblog.com

1960 births
20th-century British non-fiction writers
20th-century British journalists
21st-century British non-fiction writers
21st-century British journalists
Alumni of Corpus Christi College, Cambridge
British male non-fiction writers
Daily Mail journalists
English atheists
English biographers
English columnists
Living people
People educated at King Edward VI Grammar School, Chelmsford
The Daily Telegraph people